Ferdinand II (26 August 1469 – 7 September 1496) was King of Naples from 1495 to 1496. He was the son of Alfonso II of Naples and the grandson of Ferrante I of Naples. 

At the start of the Italian Wars in 1495, Alfonso abdicated in favor of his son, Ferdinand, when a French army led by Charles VIII threatened Naples. Unable to effectively defend the city, Ferdinand fled with a small retinue to the island of Ischia. Charles quickly occupied the city, then split his army, leaving half of it to garrison Naples, and taking the other half to return home. 

By May 1495, with fresh troops and the support of Aragon allies, Ferdinand returned to the peninsula and with the assistance of the Spanish general Gonzalo Fernández de Córdoba, expelled French soldiers from the entire kingdom. He died soon thereafter on 7 September 1496 and was succeeded by his uncle, Frederick.

Biography

Birth 
On 26 June 1467, Ferrandino was born in Castel Capuano, a residence that King Ferrante had given to his son Alfonso and his wife Ippolita Maria Sforza as a wedding gift. Her mother, Ippolita, found herself alone to give birth, as her husband was engaged on the war front in Abruzzo to fight against the Florentines, while her father-in-law was in Terra di lavoro. The prince's birth was nevertheless immediately greeted with great joy, as the kingdom had had its rightful heir. He was baptized on 5 July and was given the names Ferdinando, in honor of his grandfather, and Vincenzo, for his mother's devotion to San Vincenzo Ferreri.

The letters of his mother dating back to this early period describe him as a healthy, beautiful, and capricious newborn; in fact, it is Ippolita herself who disconsolately informs her mother, Bianca Maria Visconti, that Ferrandino is "beautiful as a pearl" but "pleasant with every person except with me; I have hope in short days we will have to be domestic and friends".

Youth 
He had as tutors, but also as advisors and secretaries, Aulus Janus Parrasius, Gabriele Altilio and Chariteo, who followed their pupil with dedication and loyalty even when he, still a teenager, was called to try his hand at the art of war.

Already at the age of fourteen, he had the opportunity to demonstrate his readiness in war, when his grandfather Ferrante put him at the head of a military expedition directed to Abruzzo, as a lieutenant of the king, with the task of defending the coasts from the attacks of the Venetian fleet, when, after the reconquest of Otranto, a new war front opened between Venice and Ferrara (Salt War,1482-1484) and Ferrante had to intervene in defense of his son-in-law Ercole I d'Este.

In the following years, Ferrandino continuously defended the kingdom, fighting against the rebellious barons during the second baronial revolt that, between 1485 and 1486, put King Ferrante in great difficulty. This was still nothing, however, compared to what would have awaited the young Ferrandino in the years of the descent of Charles VIII.

Giovanni Sabadino degli Arienti tells of a certain incident that took place on an unspecified day, but since the writer places it a few months before the death of Ippolita Maria Sforza, it would be to be traced back to when the young prince was about twenty years old. It so happened that Ferrandino "for greatness and prowess of spirit, I asked for a stout horse, that fell on him, so that he was taken away believing that he was dead". The young prince would then remain in a coma for 13 days until his mother Hippolyta, crying and devoutly invoking the help of the Virgin with endless prayers, obtained that "the lost, or perhaps lost spirits returned to the lifeless body of the son". Although the story is far-fetched, there is news from the ambassadors of his ruinous fall from his horse in the summer of 1486: initially the prince seemed to have done nothing, in fact he did not want to be medicated, but then he was assailed by a great fever and was in danger of life. Since he was now considered dead and with no hope of healing, it was "opinione de tucto lo populo" that it was the "infinite orationi made the Ill.ma madamma duchessa his mother" to free him from evil. As an ex voto, his father Alfonso had a silver image of the prince made and donated it to the church of Santa Maria di Loreto,where he had gone to request grace.

At the death of his younger brother Pietro, which occurred due to illness in 1491, he remained the last hope of Naples and of his old grandfather Ferrante, who by dying already foreshadowed the terrible war that was about to strike the kingdom. The sovereign died on 25 January 1494, Alfonso II ascended to the throne of Naples and did not hesitate a single moment before declaring war on Ludovico il Moro, occupying as the first act of hostility the city of Bari, a fief of the duke. Alfonso thus came to the rescue of his daughter Isabella, wife of Gian Galeazzo Maria Sforza, nephew of Ludovico, to whom his uncle had usurped the Duchy of Milan.

Ludovico responded to the threat by giving the green light to the monarch French Charles VIII to descend to Italy to reconquer the kingdom of Naples, which the latter believed usurped by the Aragonese to the Neapolitan Angevins.

As supreme captain of the army of the kingdom of Naples, Ferrandino always behaved honestly and, although very young, he knew how to impose order and discipline on his men. In October 1494, for example, he was fighting in Romagna against the French as an ally of Caterina Sforza, Countess of Forlì. To cause the break between the two was the so-called sack of Mordano, which took place between 20 and 21 October: around the city of Mordano they had gathered between fourteen thousand and sixteen thousand French to encircles it with siege and at the same time to trap Ferrandino, who, having fewer men, would almost certainly have been defeated.

Therefore, understanding the situation and on his generals' advice, he decided not to respond to the countess's requests for help. Caterina, very angry, passed on the side of the French, who had devastated her lands and torn her subjects, breaking the alliance with the Neapolitans, and therefore Ferrandino, having learned the news, under a diverted rain was forced to leave Faenza with his men and to get on the way to Cesena. Although they were now enemies and despite the Neapolitan army being short of food, not having been well supplied by the countess even when they were allies, notes Leone Cobelli, a chronicler from Forlì, that Ferrandino always behaved honestly and that vice versa Countess Caterina sent his men to rob him, albeit unsuccessfully:

The sources describe him always impatient to clash with the French and to test his war skills. In fact, when he was still near Imola, on 16 September 1494 "with the helmet on his head and throwing it on his thigh" he went down to openly challenge the French, and seeing that the enemy did not leave the camp "he sent some crossbowmen to invite him up to half a mile below; and no one ever showed up". Two days later, not happy, he sent a herald to the enemy captain, Gianfrancesco Sanseverino d'Aragona, Count of Caiazzo, to ask him "if he wanted to come and break some spear", with a negative result. He then repeated the challenge to the captain French, Robert Stuart d'Aubigny, and the French this time accepted, but the Count of Caiazzo prevented the test from being held and Ferrandino, disappointed, had to settle for small skirmishes.

The French invasion 
An attempt to stop the French fleet at Rapallo carrying the heavy artillery of King French resulted in disaster. After leaving Romagna, Ferrandino had gone to Rome to exhort Pope Alexander VI "to be constant and firm, and not to abandon the king his father". But the Pope, reluctantly, finally yielded to the French, and if nothing else, in an extreme conversation, embracing the young Ferrandino weepingly, offered him safe conduct with which he could cross undisturbed the entire Papal States so as to return to Naples. Ferrandino instead, by nature proud and regardless of the danger, refused indignantly the safe conduct and on the last day of the year he went out to the door of San Sebastiano, just as King Charles VIII entered from that of Santa Maria del Popolo with the army French.

With the approach of the enemy troops, Alfonso II, mentally unstable and persecuted, it is said, by the shadows of the killed barons, thought of ensuring greater stability to the throne and to the descendants by deciding to abdicate in favor of his eldest son, and he retired to monastic life at the monastery of Mazzara in Sicily.Unlike his father, a man feared for his cruelty and hated by the Neapolitans, he was much loved by the whole population "to be human and benign king" and young man of good customs, qualities that he demonstrated immediately, returning, despite the situation of deep economic crisis, to the legitimate owners the lands unjustly stolen by his father for the construction of the villa of Poggioreale, to the nuns of La Maddalena the convent that Alfonso had expropriated them for the construction of the villa called the Duchesca, and likewise returning freedom to those who for years languished in the unhealthy prisons of the castle. Ferrandino remedied in short all the offenses caused over the years by his father and grandfather, but this did not, however, prevent the end of the reign. He had also challenged King Charles VIII to a duel to decide in the old fashioned way who should own the kingdom, but the monarch French, knowing the skill of the young Neapolitan, did not want to face it.
A real betrayal was consumed against him: the cities began to give themselves spontaneously to the French and the captains and generals to plot behind him with the enemy, favoring his advance. Back in Naples from Capua, the young king was in a very bad mood, so much so that the dowager queen Joan induced him to feed after two days of fasting. He lamented that Fortune was against him and that he was losing the kingdom "without breaking a spear." When he was then told that the people were looting his stables, enraged, with a handful of men rushed to the place with the unhinged stocco and began to vehemently reproach the looters, wounding some and recovering a number of horses.

Realizing by now that the situation was irreparable, Ferrandino therefore decided to move away from Naples in search of reinforcements. Before embarking for Ischia with his family, however, he summoned the entire people and promised them that he would return within 15 days and that, if this were not the case, they could all consider themselves freed from the oath of fidelity and obedience made towards him.

He then left the new Castel to Alfonso II d'Avalos, Marquis of Pescara with 4000 Swiss mercenaries; and with 14 galleys led by Berardino Villamarina went to Ischia.

Famous remains the betrayal of the castellan of the fortress of Ischia, Justo della Candida, who made the royal family find the doors of the castle barred. Ferrandino then, under the pretext of securing at least the dowager queen Giovanna and princess Giovannella (or, according to other sources, asking to be a parliamentarian with the castellan), persuaded Justo to let him enter the fortress in the company of a single man, not believing that he alone constituted a danger. Ferrandino instead, as soon as he found himself in front of him, pulled out a dagger and "he threw himself on him with such impetus that, with the ferocity and the memory of the royal authority, he frightened the others in such a way that in his power he immediately reduced the castle and the fortress". Then, after killing him, he cut off his head with a sword blow and threw the body into the sea, thus regaining possession of the castle and the garrison.

Charles VIII in Naples 
The French entered Naples on 22 February 1495 and Charles took up residence in Castel Capuano, the ancient fortified palace of the Norman rulers. Now master of Naples, Charles asked to meet Prince Frederick in conversation and through him offered Ferrandino large possessions in France, provided that he renounced any claim to the kingdom of Naples and royal dignity. Frederick, who knew well the intentions of his nephew, immediately replied that Ferrandino would never accept such an offer, since "he was deliberate to live and die as a king, as he was born".

Despite having many supporters among the Neapolitan nobles, largely nostalgic for the Angevin period,and the almost total control of the kingdom, Charles did not know how to exploit these conditions in his favor and imposed French officials at the top of all administrations.
The weakness of his choices, dictated by the arrogant conviction of being the undisputed master of the realm and perhaps of the entire Peninsula,gave time and strength to the other Italian states to coalesce against him and ferrandino to reorganize the Neapolitan armies.

At the beginning of May 1495 a heavy naval defeat at the hands of the Genoese fleet (second battle of Rapallo)almost totally deprived Carlo of the naval support necessary for the transport of heavy artillery and the logistics of the army. In the same month the king of France, following the pro-Aragonese impulses of the Neapolitan people and the advance of Ferrandino's armies in the Kingdom, understood the need to leave Naples and set out to return to his homeland, where he managed to arrive despite the defeat suffered by the forces of the anti-French league in the battle of Fornovo.

Charles, despite having many supporters among the Neapolitan nobles, largely nostalgic for the Angevin period, and the almost total control of the kingdom, did not know how to exploit these conditions in his favor and imposed French officials at the top of all administrations. The weakness of his choices, dictated by the arrogant conviction of being the undisputed master of the realm and perhaps of the entire Peninsula, gave time and strength to the other Italian states to unite against him and Ferrandino to reorganize the Neapolitan armies.

The Battle of Seminara and the Reconquest of the Kingdom 
Ferrandino, who in the meantime had brought himself from Ischia to Messina,joined his cousin, Ferdinand II of Aragon, king of Sicily and Spain,who offered him assistance in the reconquest of the Kingdom. The Spanish general Gonzalo Fernández de Córdoba arrived from Spain with a small army consisting of 600 lancers of the Spanish cavalry and 1,500 infantry: he had been chosen by Queen Isabella to lead the Spanish contingent both because he was a court favorite and also as a soldier of considerable fame despite his young age.

De Córdoba arrived at the port of Messina on 24 May 1495, where he found Alfonso and Ferrandino very anxious; but when Ferrandino saw the Grand Captain he rejoiced, hoping to recover the kingdom. Gonzalo Fernández de Córdoba having comforted Alfonso and Ferrandino, left for Calabria, to discover that the latter had passed in Calabria with the army before him, bringing with him the fleet of Admiral Requesens, and had reoccupied Reggio. De Córdoba arrived in Calabria two days later. Ferrandino, rejoicing in this, ordered that the Companies pass in front, thus assaulting the French who had occupied the lands of Calabria.

Ferrandino led the Allied army out of the town of Seminara on 28 June and took a position along a stream. Initially the fighting turned in favor of the allies with the Spanish jinetes who prevented the Fording of the French-Swiss gendarmes by throwing their javelles and retreating, the same method used in Spain against the Moors. Ferrandino fought with great value, so that "it seemed that great Hector of Troy had resurrected", but the Calabrian militia, panicked, went back; although Ferrandino tried to block their escape, the retreating Calabrians were attacked by the gendarmes who had managed to cross the waterway triumphing.The situation soon became desperate for the allied forces: the Scottish Estuardo, nicknamed Monsignor of Aubigny, Governor of Calabria, outraged by the so daring of the Aragonese Captain, recruited from Calabria, Basilicata and other lands of the Kingdom a large number of French soldiers, and with these formed a good army, and challenged the king. Although the Grand Captain tried not to come into battle, finally to satisfy the king he accepted, and arrived on the appointed day, at the River of Seminara, fought with great courage; but King Ferrandino was easily recognized by the luxurious clothing of Aubigny, who killed his horse, causing him to fall to the ground, and would have been in danger of life, if John of Capua, brother of Andrew, Count of Altavilla had not put him back on horseback, and left protecting him as best as possible, but the Aragonese, not being able to resist the fury of the French, on the advice of the Grand Captain he returned to Reggio, and the king having realized that he had made a great mistake in having exposed in danger his person and that of all his allies, recommending all the weight of that war to the Grand Captain, he returned to his father in Messina, who found him anxious for the course of this war.

Despite the victory that the French and Swiss forces gathered on the battlefield, Ferrandino, thanks to the loyalty of the populace, was soon able to retake Naples. De Córdoba, using guerrilla tactics and carefully avoiding any confrontation with the fearsome Swiss battalions, slowly reconquered the rest of Calabria. Many of the mercenaries in the service of the French mutinied due to the non-payment of money and returned to their homeland, the remaining French forces were trapped in Atella by the combined forces of Ferdinand and de Cordova and forced to surrender. Already on 7 July, after defeating the last French garrisons, Ferrandino was able to return to Naples, welcomed by the festive population who ran to meet him among great cries, while the women covered him with flowers and odoriferous waters, and many of the noblest ran into the street to embrace him and wipe the sweat from his face.

Death and succession 
Slight aftermath of the war against the soldiers of Charles VIII dragged on until the following year, but in fact the kingdom had returned firmly into the hands of Ferrandino, who was thus able to celebrate his wedding with his aunt Giovanna, younger than him. She was a half-sister of Alfonso II, born from the second marriage of King Ferrante to Joan of Aragon. At the time of the marriage, Ferrandino was 29 years old, Giovanna 18. The wedding was celebrated in Somma Vesuviana, where the royal couple decided to stop for some time and where Ferrandino appointed his wife queen, crowning her by his hand. The marriage, however, was just able to be consummated, because immediately after Ferrandino, already ill previously with malaria, which raged at that time for Calabria, seeing his health deteriorate, he was taken to the church of the Annunziata in Naples to obtain grace of health, where he arrived there found a large part of the people who in procession had come to pray for him; and having prayed with great tears of the surrounding, he was taken to Castel Nuovo.

In this regard, the Milanese historian Bernardino Corio writes: "Ferdinando, having recovered almost everything [...] joining his wife who was the infante of Naples his friend, sister of Alfonso on his father's side, and as in love with her, taking loving pleasure, he aggravated himself more in the beginning of illness [...] and despairing of healing he was taken to Naples, where at the age of twenty-nine with incredible pain of his subjects he abandoned life".

Without a shadow of a doubt the labors of an entire life spent since the very first youth fighting for the defense of the kingdom, exposed to water, wind and frost, without indulging in the last three years even a moment of rest, had to contribute more than illness and more than marriage to his untimely death.

Ferrandino, then made a will in which he established universal heir of the kingdom Don Federico, his paternal uncle. Having then devoutly obtained the extreme anoding, he died on 7 October, at Castel Capuano, where he had been transported to litter, among the great mourning of the people who had led in procession relics, including the miraculous blood of San Gennaro, and long prayed for his healing. And again in these terms Giuliano Passaro, a saddler craftsman, describes the general condolences to his death:The good King Ferrandino was then buried with funeral gifts in the sacristy of San Domenico, near the tomb of his grandfather Ferrante.

In the absence of direct heirs of the late king, the crown was inherited by his uncle Frederick, the legitimate brother of Alfonso II. Ascended to the throne with the name of Frederick I of Naples, he was the last Neapolitan king of the Aragonese dynasty, who then ceded the kingdom to the French. Following these painful events and the definitive sunset of the Aragonese lineage, the laments for the premature death of the good Ferrandino multiplied:

Appearance and personality 
Since childhood Ferrandino was initiated to the arts of the body as of the intellect, in fact the contemporary sources, including Baldassare Castiglione, describe him as agile and well disposed in the person, very skilled in jumping, running, vaulting, tinkering and horseback riding, as well as in rides and tournaments, competitions in which he always reported the first honor. Nevertheless, it is described just as modest: "so it was his habit that he neither rejoiced at prosperity nor troubled by sadness, with a cheerful face he gave thanks to everyone"

He was valiant, of royal customs, loving, liberal and forgiving. Vincenzo Calmeta calls him "prince of high spirit and endowed with all those graces that nature and chance can give".In fact, Cariteo says of it: "Of the intrepid cor similar to the father, of humanity to the mother". 

Physically he was a good-looking young man, aitante in the person, with bright eyes, head high, wide chest, dry and muscular. Precisely with regard to this curious tendency to keep one's head held high, Castiglione reports that "what custom King Ferrandino had contracted from infirmity" while not specifying which disease it was. He also reports that knowing that he was "very handsome" of body, "King Ferrando took the opportunity to undress sometimes in a doublet". 
Alleged portrait of King Ferrandino. For the obvious similarities with the sixteenth-century engraving, it is in all probability on this portrait that Aliprando Caprioli relied to make it.
He was also cultivated in the literary arts, having as teachers Gabriele Altilio and Aulo Giano Parrasio, and in fact he delighted in composing poems and wacky people in his spare time. One wrote, for example, to his own subject, who was amazed at his departure from Naples, probably in the dramatic days of the invasion French:

Amorous Adventures 
Unlike his father and grandfather, Ferrandino did not usually keep fixed lovers with him, and in fact the existence of his illegitimate children is not known, however, like his grandfather and father he had very free sexual customs. As proof of his physical prowess as well as the favor he enjoyed among women, an episode is known to have occurred during September 1494, while Ferrandino, then Duke of Calabria, was encamped at the city of Cesena.

The event is reported in a letter dated 4 October by Bernardo Dovizi from Bibbiena to Piero il Fatuo:Ferrandino was approached one evening by a "good man" named Mattio, who made him understand that he had to talk about a matter of enormous importance. Received by the duke the next day, Mattio reported to him that there was a "noble and beautiful woman [...] for nobility and beauty, the first girl in all of Romagna" who having admired four years ago a portrait of Ferrandino and having heard praise for his countless virtues, had fallen madly in love with him and with her own risk and had come to Cesena only to be able to see him; moreover, having seen him, she had become so inflamed of him that "she finds no rest or place or thing that brings any relief to so much its fire". Mattio therefore prayed that he would deign to "have compassion on those who die for you", and that he wanted to satisfy her in his desire, because otherwise "the life of the miserable would soon be missing". Ferrandino, as is reasonable, initially remained in doubt that it could be a plot against him and that the woman wanted to poison him through coith, especially since he came from enemy territory, and therefore made her wait a few more days, meanwhile inquired about his identity, before being convinced that it was foolish on his part to doubt some danger and to consent to the meeting. Therefore, pretending to go out hunting, he went in great secrecy to a country house where the woman was waiting for her and where "he consumed the holy marriage with great sweetness of one side and the other".

This woman, indicated in the letter with the name of Caterina Gonzaga, was perhaps a Gonzaga of the Novellara branch and perhaps daughter of that Giorgio Gonzaga who died in 1487 and therefore sister of that Taddea who married Matteo Maria Boiardo. Dovizi, who is very sceptical about the sincerity of the love professed by the woman, does not fail to write his impressions in this regard to Piero il Fatuo, judging that Caterina must perhaps have heard of the considerable size of Ferrandino's manly member, whom he describes in enthusiastic terms as "very honorable", and that therefore more than by love he was driven by lust.Although Ferrandino has not then "for his conscience" revealed to anyone the relationship if not to a few people, including precisely the Dovizi (with whom he used to speak "freely of everything") and the Marquis of Pescara Alfonso II d'Avalos, the fame of the great beauty of this Catherine came to the ears of Ludovico il Moro who at that time was in Asti in the company of the King of France, who was always eager to have beautiful women around him. Ludovico then sent a put to Catherine inviting her to go to Asti to please the king and offered her in return the sum of over 3500 ducats that should have been used to pay for the trip. Caterina, however, outraged by the proposal, prayed to Ferrandino that he would help her to invent a good excuse to decline the offer, because "she neither wants nor can leave". He then decided, to the laughter of his friends, that Caterina promised the Moro to go and accept the offer in money, but that he instead stole the duchies from the man who would bring them to him and stay with him in Cesena.
Nevertheless Ferrandino, since he had been told that Piero il Fatuo had tried to obtain the woman without succeeding, showed himself very willing to lend it to him, saying: "I want these women's things, like the others, to be common among us". Dovizi replied by saying that the exchange offer to Piero would certainly not be agreed, as Piero had lovers with him while Ferrandino did not, he also judged that his availability was due to the fact that in truth he did not like Caterina's "meat", something that Ferrandino assured him not to be true, claiming "that he likes everything about her" and that indeed before leaving "he wants another feast".

From a subsequent letter from Dovizi, dated 9 October, we learn that Piero il Fatuo then sent certain letters to the camp with a portrait of Caterina herself, demonstrating that the woman had already been his lover. Dovizi reports that Ferrandino, after reading the letter with him, "laughed so much and so heartily that I could not say any more, and I swear to you that I have not seen him nor do I think I can ever see him in such joy as he was then", and he wanted it to be re-read several times even in the presence of the Avalos. Ferrandino then confessed that he had lied in saying that he liked the woman, believing that neither Piero nor Dovizi knew her, while in truth he had not liked it at all, if not for "a little manners", and that he was "more out of boredom than the devil". He also adds that if Caterina still wants him, then she will have to come herself to the military camp  to find him, "otherwise she can scratch it so much that she coves the desire by herself", since he "will not move a step", and that "if she does not come to the camp, she can be hanged for him, who no longer plans to see him again, and if he came to the camp he would prove how heavy the Marquis weighs", or if he showed up in the military camp Ferrandino would offer it as much to his friend Alfonso d'Avalos. Dovizi concludes the matter by saying that Ferrandino also offered him to try the woman, but that he would never have allowed himself to lie with a woman with whom he had already lay his lord Piero, in fact "where the master has gone he would beware as much as the fire and the devil himself go there".

The letters of Dovizi of this period, overly stuffed with obscenity and double meanings, since the nineteenth century have been abundantly censored in all the works and essays that deal with the subject, however they are still preserved at theMedici state archive in Florence and digitally usable.

Certainly Ferrandino was aware of his physical qualities and did not exploit them only for his own personal gain, but also for those political-diplomatic issues that could benefit the state: in fact, he always writes the usual Dovizi, who in presenting himself in Forlì to countess Caterina Sforza, of whom he sought the alliance in the war against the French, Ferrandino "went tight and beautifully dressed in the Neapolitan style". In fact, he knew that Countess Catherine had a real passion for good-looking men and probably hoped to win their friendship. The attempt, perhaps, had a certain success, as Dovizi, in a specially enigmatic language, goes on to say that although Ferrandino the countess was not physically liked then very much, nevertheless "they shook hands scratching and at the same time noticed a lot of sparkling eyes", also the castellan Giacomo Feo, then a young lover of the same countess, showed himself quite jealous, in fact Ferrandino and Caterina "they stayed about two hours together but under the eyes of all, since the Feo wants she for himself".

In mass culture 

 The character Ferdinand in William Shakespeare's play The Tempest is based on the historical figure of Ferdinand.
 In the 2011-2013 Canadian television series The Borgias, Ferdinand is theoretically played by the Swedish actor Matias Varela, though the character shown in the series has nothing in common with the historical figure of Ferdinand other than the name.

Honours

See also
Italian Wars
History of Naples
List of monarchs of Naples

References

Sources

External links

 Genealogy entry for Ferdinand II
 

1469 births
1496 deaths
15th-century monarchs of Naples
House of Trastámara
Ferdinand 2
Burials at the Basilica of San Domenico, Naples